He Zi (born 11 December 1990 in Nanning, Guangxi) is an Olympic medal winning Chinese female diver, specialising in the 1 meter springboard, 3 meter springboard and 3 meter synchronised dive.

Career

Among her achievements are:

 2006 – silver medal in both the 1 m and 3 m springboard events of the Asian Games.
 2007 – gold medal in the women's 1 m springboard event of the World Aquatics Championships.
 2009 – gold medal in the women's 3 m springboard event of the FINA Diving World Series.
 2010 – won gold in 3 m springboard and gold (with Wu Minxia) in the synchronised 3 m springboard at the 17th FINA Diving World Cup.
 2011 – won gold (with Wu Minxia) in the synchronised 3 m springboard and silver in the 3 m springboard at the 2011 World Aquatics Championships.
 2012 – won gold (with Wu Minxia) in women's 3m springboard synchronized diving at the 2012 Summer Olympics.
 2012 – won silver in 3m in women's 3m springboard diving at the 2012 Summer Olympics.
 2013 - won gold in 1m springboard in 2013 World Championships in Barcelona, beating Tania Cognotto of Italy by just 0.1 points. 
 2016 – won silver in 3m in women's 3m springboard diving at the 2016 Summer Olympics.

Personal life
Right after she won silver in the 3m springboard dive on 14 August 2016, He Zi accepted a marriage proposal by boyfriend and fellow diver Qin Kai, whom she has dated for 6 years. They married in June 2017, and in July she announced her retirement from international competition. Their daughter was born in October 2017.

See also
 China at the 2012 Summer Olympics
 China at the 2016 Summer Olympics

References

External links 
 
 
 
 
 

1990 births
Living people
People from Nanning
Sportspeople from Guangxi
Chinese female divers
Olympic divers of China
Olympic gold medalists for China
Olympic medalists in diving
2016 Olympic silver medalists for China
Divers at the 2016 Summer Olympics
Divers at the 2012 Summer Olympics
Medalists at the 2012 Summer Olympics
World Aquatics Championships medalists in diving
Asian Games gold medalists for China
Asian Games silver medalists for China
Asian Games medalists in diving
Divers at the 2006 Asian Games
Divers at the 2010 Asian Games
Divers at the 2014 Asian Games
Medalists at the 2006 Asian Games
Medalists at the 2010 Asian Games
Medalists at the 2014 Asian Games
Universiade medalists in diving
Universiade gold medalists for China
Olympic silver medalists for China
Medalists at the 2011 Summer Universiade
21st-century Chinese women